John Dix is the name of:

John Adams Dix (1798–1879), Governor of New York from 1873 to 1874
John Alden Dix (1860–1928), Governor of New York from 1911 to 1912
John Ross Dix (1811–after 1863), a British writer and poet in Great Britain and America

See also
John Dix Fisher, U.S. physician
John Dicks (disambiguation)